"Downfall" is a song by American rock band Matchbox Twenty. The song was written by producer Matt Serletic and lead singer Rob Thomas. It was released in 2004 as the fourth single from their 2002 album, More Than You Think You Are, alongside "All I Need", which was released on the same day in Australia. "Downfall" reached number 27 on the US Billboard Adult Top 40 in mid-2004.

Charts

References

2002 songs
2004 singles
Atlantic Records singles
Matchbox Twenty songs
Song recordings produced by Matt Serletic
Songs written by Matt Serletic
Songs written by Rob Thomas (musician)